Devi tv is a Hindi-language 24/7 Hindu television channel, owned by Vaidanta Group . The channel is a free-to-air and launched on 8 April 2016. The channel is available across all major cable and DTH platforms as well as online.

References

Hindi-language television channels in India
Television channels and stations established in 2016
Hindi-language television stations
Television stations in India
Religious television channels in India